Kwama (also Afan Mao, Amam, Gogwama, Goma, Gwama, Koma of Asosa, Nokanoka, North Koma, T'wa Kwama, Takwama) is a Koman language, spoken in the South Benishangul-Gumuz region of Ethiopia, along the Sudan border between Asosa and Gidami.

An early record of this language is a wordlist dated March 1882 by Juan Maria Schuver.

References

Languages of Ethiopia
Koman languages